Milan Presse is a publishing company based in Toulouse, France, that has been owned by Bayard Presse since 2004.

It runs an imprint, Éditions Milan, which specialises in children's literature. This branch has published the original Beechwood Bunny Tales (La Famille Passiflore series) by Geneviève Huriet and Amélie Sarn.

References

External links

—
—

Book publishing companies of France
Mass media in Toulouse
Companies based in Occitania (administrative region)
Publishing companies established in 1980
1980 establishments in France